The  Academic Symphony Orchestra of the Lviv National Philharmonic  is one of the oldest symphony orchestras in Ukraine.

History 
In 1796, violinist and conductor Józef Elsner initiated the creation of the first Music Academy in Lviv. It brought together professional musicians and educated amateurs and became the first concert organization in the city. In 1799, Karol Lipinski became the first violinist, concertmaster of the Lviv Theater, and from 1811 - its conductor. Lipinsky initiated the creation of the symphony orchestra. Franz Xaver Wolfgang Mozart, son of Wolfgang Amadeus Mozart, founded the Society of St. Cecilia in 1826, in which there were a choir and an institute of singing. The activity of the society became an impetus for the formation of new professional cells of organized musical and artistic life. Symphony concerts with the participation of professional musicians and amateurs were also organized by the "Society of friends of music," which operated since 1834. Within a few years, it received an official status under the name "Society for the development of music in Galicia," later – "Galician Music Society" (GMT). 

The Academic Symphony Orchestra of the Lviv National Philharmonic named after Myroslav Skoryk was officially formed on September 27, 1902,  when the first concert of the newly created collective took place in the Count Stanislav Skarbko Theater. It had 1,240 seats, a large moving stage (160 m2), a concert organ, and was equipped with electric lighting and central heating. The main conductor of the orchestra was Ludvík Vítězslav Čelanský, who gathered a group of 68 people, the vast majority of whom were graduates of the Prague Conservatory. Henryk Jarecki and Henryk Melcer-Szczawiński worked next to him at the conductor's desk. During the first season, more than 114 concerts were held with the participation of the orchestra. The concert programs included almost all symphonies by Ludwig van Beethoven, symphonic masterpieces by Felix Mendelssohn, Wolfgang Amadeus Mozart, Franz Schubert, Robert Schumann, Franz Liszt, Antonin Dvorak, Anton Bruckner, Gustav Mahler, Camille Saint-Saens, Pyotr Tchaikovsky, and Richard Strauss.

Richard Strauss, Gustav Mahler, Ruggiero Leoncavallo, Mieczysław Karłowicz, and Lorenzo Perozi performed as invited conductors with the Lviv ensemble. Strauss conducted the orchestra on January 5, 1903. He directed his own compositions - symphonic poems "Don Juan" and "Death and Transfiguration," as well as the Symphony №5 by Beethoven. On April 2, 1903, the Lviv ensemble was conducted by Gustav Mahler. The program of the concert included Symphony №7 by Beethoven, the "Roman Carnival" by Hector Berlioz, the overture to "Tannhäuser" by Richard Wagner and the First Symphony by Gustav Mahler. Once again, the latter sounded in a second concert (April 4). Along with this composition, the musicians also performed Ludwig van Beethoven's Seventh Symphony, overtures, and symphonic fragments from the operas "Tristan and Isolde," "Tannhäuser," and "The Master-Singers of Nuremberg" by Richard Wagner.

In May 1903 (May 7 and 9), Ruggero Leoncavallo conducted the Symphony Orchestra. The concert's program included fragments from the operas "Pagliacci" and "I Medici," "Neapolitan suite," "Old Suite" and the symphonic poem "Seraphitus-Seraphita." After the season, the orchestra went on tour to Krakow, Lodz, Warsaw, and Vilnius, where it ceased to exist. 

For a long time, the Lviv Philharmonic did not have its own orchestra. Its director Leopold Litinsky made an attempt to create such a group from among the best musicians of military orchestras of several local infantry regiments, which continued the concert activities of the Philharmonic in 1903-1904. In the following years, touring orchestras primarily performed in Lviv. 

During 1919-1939, the symphony orchestra of the GMT Conservatory remained practically the only permanent orchestra in Lviv. From time to time, a large symphony orchestra of the Polish Union of Musicians, organized in 1921 and consisting of 106 instrumentalists, performed under the auspices of the Lviv Philharmonic and M. Türk’s Concert Bureau (it united performers from the GMT and the City Theater and operated until 1924). His programs were prepared by Bronislaw Wolfstal, Adam Soltis and Alfred Stadler, Milan Zuna.

During this period, in particular in the concert season of 1931-1932, due to the economic crisis, the musical departments of the City Theater were disbanded. The musicians joined the orchestra of the "Society of music and opera lovers," starting their own concert activities with a series of symphony concerts. 

With the arrival of Soviet power, in December 1939, came the Resolution of the Council of People's Commissars of the USSR of December 19, 1939, concerning the organization of cultural and artistic institutions in six newly formed western regions of Ukraine and the reorganization of art institutions and educational institutions by the Soviet People's Commissar and the Central Committee of the Communist Party according to which it was planned to create in Lviv a state regional philharmonic with a symphony orchestra, and a Ukrainian choir, with a variety sector and soloists. The symphony orchestra was formed under the regional radio committee. The band first performed on December 20, 1939 under the guidance of Isaac Pain, a 27-year-old conductor, a graduate of the Kiev Conservatory. In early 1940, this orchestra was reorganized into the Symphony Orchestra of the Lviv State Regional Philharmonic. It was headed by Isaac Pain. Lviv conductor and composer Mykola Kolessa was also invited to work in the orchestra. During the German occupation, in 1941-1944, the Philharmonic Hall did not operate. In the post-war period, the orchestra had to be assembled anew, which happened with the joint efforts of Isaac Pain, Dionysius Khabal, Nestor Gornitsky and Mykola Kolessa. The team resumed its work in August 1944. The first concerts featured works by Stanyslav Lyudkevych, Vasyl Barvinsky, Mykola Lysenko, Stanisław Moniuszko, Camille Saint-Saens, Pyotr Tchaikovsky, and Karl Maria von Weber.

During 1953-1957, and later - in 1987-1989, the conductor of the orchestra was Yuriy Lutsiv. From 1964 to 1987, the symphony orchestra was led by Demyan Pelekhaty. From 1989 the main conductor of the orchestra was Ivan Yuzyuk, the conductors were Roman Filipchuk and Yarema Kolessa. Later this position was held by Aidar Torybayev, Ilya Stupel, Taras Krysa. Since 2018, the orchestra has been cooperating with American conductor of Ukrainian origin Theodore Kuchar, who is now the main guest conductor of the orchestra.

In 2006, the Lviv National Philharmonic Symphony Orchestra was awarded the title "Academic." In 2018, with the participation of this group, during the Myroslav Skoryk author's concert, the Lviv Philharmonic received "national" status. Since September, 2020, the Philharmonic has been named after this Ukrainian composer. The concertmasters of the orchestra are Honored Artist of Ukraine Marko Komonko and Mykola Gavyuk.

The Symphony Orchestra of the Lviv National Philharmonic is a regular participant in international festivals. In particular, the International Festival of musical art "Virtuosos," the International Festival of contemporary music "Contrasts," the Ukrainian-Polish Festival "Discovering Paderewski." The orchestra has toured in many countries around the world, including Poland, Italy, Spain, France, Switzerland, Germany, the Netherlands, and China. Over the past few seasons, the orchestra has made a number of important recordings for major international labels, including Naxos and Brilliant Classics.

Gallery

See also 
 Music of Ukraine
 List of Ukrainian composers
 Symphony No. 2 (Revutsky)

References

Sources 
 Lviv National Philharmonic Orchestra of Ukraine

Ukrainian classical music groups
Culture in Lviv
Ukrainian orchestras